Glenn Calvin Myatt (July 9, 1897 – August 9, 1969) was an American professional baseball catcher. He played in Major League Baseball (MLB) from 1920 to 1935 for the Philadelphia Athletics (1920–1921), Cleveland Indians (1922–1935), New York Giants (1935–1936), and Detroit Tigers (1936).

In 1004 games over 16 seasons, Myatt posted a .270 batting average (722-for-2678) scoring 346 runs, 38 home runs and 387 runs batted in (RBIs). He finished his career with a .972 fielding percentage, playing at catcher and all three outfield positions.

External links

1897 births
1969 deaths
Major League Baseball catchers
New York Giants (NL) players
Philadelphia Athletics players
Cleveland Indians players
Detroit Tigers players
Baseball players from Arkansas